Empis stercorea is a large species of dance flies, in the fly family Empididae. It is included in the subgenus Xanthempis. It is found in most of Europe, except the Iberian Peninsula.

References

External links
Fauna Europaea

Empis
Asilomorph flies of Europe
Insects described in 1761
Taxa named by Carl Linnaeus